Roadvale is a rural locality in the Scenic Rim Region, Queensland, Australia.

Geography 

The main street is Gray Street, which is also the Roadvale-Kalbar Road.

Roadvale is a growing centre for many of the small crop products sold in South East Queensland and other areas.

Ipswich – Boonah Road (State Route 93) runs through from north to south.

History 
The locality takes its name from its former railway station which was named by the Queensland Railways Department in 1887, because of its location at a road junction.

The Fassifern railway line (Queensland's first branch railway line) opened from Ipswich to Harrisville on 10 July 1882. On 12 September 1887 the line was extended to Dugundan with the Roadvale district being served by Roadvale railway station on the corner of Wilsons Plains Road and Redhill Road. The line closed in June 1964.

Milbong Lutheran Church (also known as St Luke's Lutheran Church) opened on 23 September 1885. A new church (built on  the site of the original church) was opened on 10 April 1906, while the old church was removed to be use as a barn but was later burned down. The church closed in 1974 and the church building removed, but the cemetery remains. The church site and cemetery is on the Ispwich Boonah Road.

St Andrew's Anglican Church was dedicated on 11 May 1912 by Venerable Henry Le Fanu, the Archdeacon of Toowoomba. In 1926, the church closed and the building was relocated to Camp Hill in Brisbane to become the Anglican Church of the Annunciation.

In 1915 most of the town was destroyed by fire.  Despite rebuilding many businesses, the town has never recovered from the devastating fire.

Heritage listings 
The heritage-listed sites in Roadvale include:

 111 Roadvale Road: Roadvale State School

Facilities 
It has a pub and a small general store in the main street.

See also

References

External links

 University of Queensland: Queensland Places: Roadvale

Towns in Queensland
Scenic Rim Region
Localities in Queensland